The 2010–11 Scottish Second Division was the sixteenth season of the Second Division in its current format of ten teams.

Promotion and relegation from 2009–10

First & Second Divisions
Relegated from First Division to Second Division
Ayr United
Airdrie United (via play-offs)

Promoted from Second Division to First Division
Stirling Albion
Cowdenbeath(via play-offs)

Second & Third Divisions
Relegated from Second Division to Third Division
Clyde
Arbroath (via play-offs)

Promoted from Third Division to Second Division
Livingston
Forfar Athletic (via play-offs)

League table

Results
Teams play each other four times in this league. In the first half of the season each team plays every other team twice (home and away) and then do the same in the second half of the season, for a total of 36 games

First half of season

Second half of season

Top goalscorers

21 goals
  Mark Roberts (Ayr United)
  Iain Russell (Livingston)

18 goals
  Rory McAllister (Brechin City)

13 goals
  Bobby Linn (East Fife)
  Jon McShane (Dumbarton)

Second Division play-offs
Times are BST (UTC+1)

Semi-finals
The fourth placed team in the Third Division will play the ninth placed team in the Second Division, and third placed team in the Third Division will play the second placed team in the Third Division. The play-offs will be played over two legs on Wednesday 11 May 2011 & Saturday 14 May 2011, the winning team in each semi-final will advance to the final televised live on BBC Alba on Sunday 22 May 2011.

First legs

Second legs

Final
The two semi-final winners will play each other over two legs. The winning team will be awarded a place in the 2011–12 Second Division.

First leg

Second leg

Stadia

See also
 Scottish football referee strike

References

External links
2010–11 Scottish Second Division at Soccerway

Scottish Second Division seasons
2010–11 Scottish Football League
3
Scot

sco:2010–11 Scots Seicont Diveesion